Jörg Stocker (c. 1461 – after 1527) was a German painter.

Further reading 
 Janez Höfler. "Stocker, Jörg." In Grove Art Online. Oxford Art Online, (accessed January 1, 2012; subscription required).
 Gerhard Weiland: "Die Ulmer Künstler und ihr Zunft." Meisterwerke massenhaft. Die Bildhauerwerkstatt des Niklaus Weckmann und die Malerei in Ulm um 1500. pp. 369–388. Württembergischen Landesmuseum Stuttgart, 1993, 
 Daniela Gräfin von Pfeil: "Jörg Stocker – ein verkannter Maler aus Ulm." Meisterwerke massenhaft. Die Bildhauerwerkstatt des Niklaus Weckmann und die Malerei in Ulm um 1500. pp. 199–210. Württembergischen Landesmuseum Stuttgart, 1993, 
 Hans Koepf, "Schüchlin, Herlin und Zeitblom." Schwäbische Kunstgeschichte, Vol. 3, Jan Thorbecke Verlag Konstanz 1963, pp. 110–111

External links 
 
 Entry for Jörg Stocker in the Union List of Artist Names

15th-century German painters
German male painters
16th-century German painters
Renaissance painters
People from Ulm
Year of birth uncertain
Year of death unknown